Shahdol is a city in Shahdol district in the Indian state of Madhya Pradesh.

Demographics
 India census, Shahdol had a population of 86,681.

References